Stylidium divaricatum, known by the vernacular name daddy-long-legs, is a species in the genus Stylidium that is endemic to Western Australia.

It was first described by the German botanist Otto Wilhelm Sonder in 1845.

See also 
 List of Stylidium species

References 

Asterales of Australia
Carnivorous plants of Australia
Eudicots of Western Australia
Plants described in 1845
divaricatum
Taxa named by Otto Wilhelm Sonder